The Mark, Tom and Travis Show Tour was a concert tour by rock band Blink-182. Launched in support of the group's 1999 album Enema of the State, the tour visited amphitheatres and arenas between the summer of 2000 and spring of 2001. The tour was considered "one of the most anticipated rock tours of the season", and was supported by Bad Religion and Fenix TX.

The tour was celebrated with live album titled The Mark, Tom and Travis Show (The Enema Strikes Back!) (2000). The concert was actually recorded at the band's 1999 Loserkids tour.

Background
With massive radio and video play, Blink-182 played to larger crowds when they began touring in support of Enema of the State. The band played to sold-out audiences and performed worldwide during the summer of 2000 on the Mark, Tom and Travis Show tour. The tour was staged as a drive-in movie, with a giant retro billboard suspended from the ceiling, and films were projected on the screen behind the band—including vintage gay porn as a joke. Barker broke one of his fingers during an altercation with two men who kept flirting with his girlfriend in Ohio, and Damon Delapaz, guitarist of Fenix TX, stepped in on drums for Barker.

When questioned about the decision to tour with Blink-182, Bad Religion frontman Greg Graffin said, "I was happy to be asked, because it's a great way to reach some people who've never heard punk rock, who are now willing to listen to it." Hoppus was effusive of their inclusion. "Watching them play every night is just a huge honor for us, and to have them on tour is the best thing ever", said Hoppus. "I think it's rad, because a lot of the kids that come to the shows probably never even heard of Bad Religion or don't know what it's really all about. What Bad Religion gave to us is kind of like what we are giving back to the kids of the next generation, hopefully."

To celebrate the success of the tour, the band released a limited edition live album titled The Mark, Tom and Travis Show (The Enema Strikes Back!), which featured snippets of the band's infamous between-song dialogue. Released in November 2000, the band returned to the studio with Finn to complete a song left off the final track listing of Enema of the State: "Man Overboard." Although MTV News initially reported the album would feature recordings made "during its spring-summer tour," the album's content ended up featuring concerts from the band's 1999 Loserkids tour.

The band cancelled an Australian leg on November 7, 2000 when Barker was diagnosed with a "severe case of the flu."

Setlist

"Dumpweed"
"Don't Leave Me"
"Aliens Exist"
"Family Reunion"
"Going Away to College"
"What's My Age Again?"
"Dick Lips"
"Blow Job"
"Untitled"
"Voyeur"
"Pathetic"
"Adam's Song"
"Peggy Sue"
"Wendy Clear"
"Carousel"
Encore
"All the Small Things"

"Mutt"
"The Country Song"
"Dammit"
Notes
The band would sometimes alternate between humorous covers of Christina Aguilera's "Genie in a Bottle" and Sisqó's "Thong Song" during encores.

Tour dates

Reception
In describing the tour, Hoppus said at the time:

Gavin Edwards, who interviewed the band at various stops on the tour for their August 2000 Rolling Stone cover, wrote that "In ninety entertaining minutes, the band zooms through nineteen songs […] they act just like they do offstage, only with musical instruments strapped around their torsos."  Nina Garin of MTV News reviewed the band's first show of the tour, commenting, "While the music inspired chest-pounding and breast-flashing, it was the trio's signature stage banter that kept the hour-and-a-half show moving at full speed. They rattled off jokes about vaginas and penises. There was a short song about blow jobs and another featuring nothing but profanities." Christopher Gray of The Austin Chronicle was positive in his assumptions of the band's May 16 Austin performance, writing, "Yes, they may write songs called "Dick Lips", "Shit Piss", and "Blowjob", but still they came across as ... wholesome. Good boys. It could have been the Fifties aura of their drive-in-and-Cadillacs stage set, or perhaps DeLonge's wide-eyed glee at catching a fan's brassiere, but it was probably the songs: jet-engine blasts of adolescent heartache/bliss with more hooks than an East Texas tackle shop."

The tour featured $20-$25 ticket prices and sold 80% of tickets, grossing $7 million.

Notes

References

External links
 

Blink-182 concert tours
2000 concert tours
2001 concert tours